COMPAS is a Canadian polling company.

References

External links
COMPAS home page

Market research companies of Canada